Ngala is a local government area of Borno State, Nigeria, adjacent to the border with Cameroon. Its headquarters are in the town of Gamboru Ngala.

It has an area of 1,465 km and a population of 237,071 at the 2006 census.

The postal code of the area is 611.

It is one of the sixteen LGAs that constitute the Dikwa Emirate, a traditional state located in Borno State, Nigeria.

Geology 
Ngala is situated in the east central area of the state. It is not far from the Chad Basin, which has been a structural depression since the Tertiary period. It is blessed with vast fertile lands of sandy-loam to clay soil types, where crops like wheat, rice, and vegetables are grown under irrigated conditions.

Vegetation and soil 
This local government area is blessed with a vast fertile land of sandy-loam to clay soil types, where crops like wheat, rice, and vegetables are grown under irrigated conditions. The land is characterized by a sandy flat plain land with scanty vegetation from the central to the northern part, while to the south the soil is sandy loam to heavy clay, with uneven topography characterized by sand dust. The vegetation is moderate.

Land form, relief and drainage 
The land in Ngala generally consists of plains which are covered by a superficial deposit of sand and clay. Rather there accumulation of sand due to the action of the prevailing winds in blowing the loose Sahara sand from the desert to fringe areas. The river Gnadda is the only river passing through the area. The rainfall obtained in Ngala is seasonal. The rainfall has it pick in the months of August and September.

Mineral resources include clay and bentonite.

Socioeconomic 
Almost eighty-five percent (85%) of the people of the study area are farmers, herdsmen and fishermen.  Agriculture is the pivot of the state's economy. Ngala has enormous agricultural and livestock development potential and is a large livestock centre.  Its major cash crops include: groundnut, cotton, cowpea. Other crops are wheat, rice, and watermelon. Some crops in Ngala are irrigated.

People 
The people in study area are largely Kanuri, Hausa/Fulani-speaking people. Most are farmers, while a few practice fishing activities.

Towns 
 Gamboru Ngala, the capital
 Wulgo town, located very close to the coast of Chad

References

Local Government Areas in Borno State
Populated places in Borno State